Lammi (also ) is a former municipality of Finland. It was consolidated with Hämeenlinna on 2009-01-01.

It is located in the province of Southern Finland and is part of the Tavastia Proper region. The municipality had a population of 5,507 (2008) and covered an area of 611.24 km² of which 73.69 km² is water. The population density is 11 inhabitants per km². 

Neighbouring municipalities were Asikkala, Hauho, Hausjärvi, Hämeenkoski, Janakkala, Kärkölä, Luopioinen, Padasjoki and Tuulos.

The municipality was unilingually Finnish.

The lake Kuohijärvi is located in Lammi and the lake Pääjärvi is situated at the border between Lammi and Hämeenkoski.

Notable people
 Leo Leppä

See also 
 Evo, Hämeenlinna

References

External links 

 

Populated places disestablished in 2009
2009 disestablishments in Finland
Former municipalities of Finland
Hämeenlinna